George Chamier (8 April 1842–25 April 1915) was a New Zealand engineer, surveyor and novelist. He was born in Cheltenham, Gloucestershire, England on 8 April 1842.

Writings 
 The Utilisation of Water in South Australia, 1886
Philosopher Dick, 1890
 A south sea siren, 1895
 The Story of a successful man, 1895
 War and Pessimism, and Other Studies, 1911

References

1842 births
1915 deaths
New Zealand engineers
New Zealand surveyors
English emigrants to New Zealand
New Zealand male novelists
19th-century New Zealand novelists
19th-century male writers
19th-century New Zealand engineers